Hallinan is a surname. Notable people with the surname include:

Ed Hallinan (1888–1940), American baseball player
Jimmy Hallinan (1849–1879), Irish Major League Baseball player
Joseph Hallinan, American journalist and author
Olivia Hallinan (born 1984), English actress
Paul John Hallinan (1911–1968), American prelate of the Roman Catholic Church
Renae Hallinan (born 1986), Australian netball player in the ANZ Championship
Terence Hallinan (1936–2020), American attorney and politician from San Francisco
Timothy Hallinan (born 1949), American thriller writer
Vincent Hallinan (1896–1992), American lawyer and a candidate for President of the United States for the Progressive Party in the 1952 election